Walt Peacosh (September 16, 1935 – July 23, 2017) was a Canadian former ice hockey player. Peacosh was a member of the Trail Smoke Eaters who won a gold medal at the 1961 World Ice Hockey Championships in Switzerland. He also played professionally with the Spokane Comets and Vancouver Canucks.

References

1935 births
2017 deaths
Canadian ice hockey left wingers
Ice hockey people from Manitoba
People from The Pas